Levadia III is a football club in Tallinn. It's the reserve team of FC Levadia U21. Currently it plays in II Liiga N/E.

In 2003 named Tallinna FC Levadia II, in 2004-2007 Maardu FC Levadia-Juunior.

Players

First-team squad
 As of 29 October 2017.

Statistics

League and Cup

References

External links

2003 establishments in Estonia
Football clubs in Tallinn